Marquess of Lansdowne is a title in the Peerage of Great Britain created in 1784, and held by the head of the Petty-Fitzmaurice family. The first Marquess served as Prime Minister of Great Britain.

Origins
This branch of the Fitzmaurice family descends from John Fitzmaurice, second son of Thomas Fitzmaurice, 1st Earl of Kerry (see Earl of Kerry for earlier history of the family), and his wife Anne, the daughter of the political economist Sir William Petty, whose wife had been created Baroness Shelburne for her own life only and whose two sons had been created at different times Baron Shelburne in the peerage of Ireland and Earl of Shelburne respectively, but who had both died without heirs. In 1751, on the death of his maternal uncle Henry Petty, Earl of Shelburne, John Fitzmaurice succeeded to his estates and assumed by Act of Parliament the surname of Petty in addition to FitzMaurice. That same year, he was created Viscount FitzMaurice and Baron Dunkeron in the Peerage of Ireland. In 1753, the earldom held by his uncle was revived when he was made Earl of Shelburne, in the County of Wexford, in the Peerage of Ireland. He later represented Wycombe in the House of Commons as a Whig, his Irish peerages not disbarring him. However, in 1760 Viscount FitzMaurice was created Baron Wycombe, of Chepping Wycombe in the County of Buckingham, in the Peerage of Great Britain, which gave him a seat in the House of Lords at Westminster and meant that he could no longer sit in the Commons.

Through his first wife Lady Sophia Carteret (1745–1771), only daughter of Robert Carteret, 3rd Earl Granville, Fitzmaurice acquired large estates, including Lansdowne Hill near Bath, from which his son later took a new title. 

From 1765 until the Reform Act 1832, the head of the family controlled the two seats in parliament of the pocket borough of Calne in Wiltshire. After 1832, there was only one seat and a wider franchise, but a member of the family was usually elected until the borough was abolished in 1885.

Creations
The first Earl of Shelburne of the new creation was succeeded by his eldest son William Petty-FitzMaurice, 2nd Earl of Shelburne. He was a prominent statesman and served as Prime Minister of Great Britain from 1782 to 1783. His  brother Thomas FitzMaurice (1742–1793) of Cliveden, was a Member of Parliament. 
In 1784, the second Earl of Shelburne was created Marquess of Lansdowne, in the County of Somerset, Earl of Wycombe, of Chepping Wycombe, and Viscount Calne and Calston, referring to Calne and Calstone in the County of Wiltshire, all in the Peerage of Great Britain. However, he is better known to history under his former title of Earl of Shelburne. He was succeeded by his son from his first marriage to Lady Sophia Carteret, John Henry Petty-Fitzmaurice, 2nd Marquess of Lansdowne. He died childless in 1809 and was succeeded by his half-brother, the third Marquess, the son of their father’s second marriage, to Lady Louisa FitzPatrick. Known as Lord Henry Petty from 1784 to 1809, he was one of the most influential Whig politicians of the first half of the 19th century. In a ministerial career spanning over fifty years, he served as Chancellor of the Exchequer from 1806 to 1807, as Home Secretary from 1827 to 1828, as Lord President of the Council from 1830 to 1834, 1835 to 1841, and 1846 to 1852, and as Minister without Portfolio from 1852 to 1858. He twice declined to become Prime Minister and in 1857 refused the offer of a dukedom from Queen Victoria. In 1818 Lansdowne also succeeded his cousin as fourth Earl of Kerry. His eldest son William Petty FitzMaurice, Earl of Kerry, was a Member of Parliament for Calne, but predeceased his father, without having a son. Lansdowne was therefore succeeded by his second son, the fourth Marquess. He had already in 1856 been summoned to the House of Lords through a writ of acceleration in his father's junior title of Baron Wycombe and served under Lord Palmerston as Parliamentary Under-Secretary of State for Foreign Affairs from 1856 to 1858. He married as his second wife Emily Jane Mercer-Elphinstone-de Flahault, 8th Lady Nairne (see the Lord Nairne), eldest daughter of the French general and statesman Charles Joseph, comte de Flahaut, and his wife Margaret Nairne, 7th Lady Nairne.

He was succeeded by his eldest son from his second marriage, the fifth Marquess. Like his grandfather, he was a prominent statesman and had an equally long ministerial career. Lord Lansdowne was Governor-General of Canada from 1883 to 1888, Viceroy of India from 1888 to 1894, Secretary of State for War from 1895 to 1900, Foreign Secretary from 1900 to 1905, Leader of the Conservative Party in the Lords from 1911 to 1916, and also served in the war-time coalition government as Minister without Portfolio from 1915 to 1916. In 1895 he succeeded his mother as Lord Nairne. His eldest son, Henry Petty-Fitzmaurice, sat as Unionist Member of Parliament for West Derbyshire from 1908 to 1918 and was a Senator of the Irish Free State in 1922. In 1927 he succeeded his father and became the 6th Marquess. 

On his death in 1936 he was succeeded by his second but eldest surviving son, the seventh Marquess, who was killed in action in 1944 during the Second World War, unmarried. As the third and youngest brother, Lord Edward Norman Petty-Fitzmaurice, had been killed in action only a week before, the Scottish lordship of Nairne was passed on to their eldest sister Katherine (see Lord Nairne for later history of this title). Lord Lansdowne was survived in the remaining titles by his first cousin, the eighth Marquess. He was the son of Major Lord Charles George Francis Mercer Nairne Petty-Fitzmaurice (1874–1914), second son of the fifth Marquess. Born George John Charles Mercer Nairne, he assumed by Decree of the Lord Lyon the additional surnames of Petty-Fitzmaurice in 1947. Lord Lansdowne sat on the Conservative benches in the House of Lords and served as Joint Parliamentary Under-Secretary of State for Foreign Affairs from 1958 to 1962 and as Minister of State for Colonial Affairs from 1962 to 1964. As of 2014 the titles are held by his eldest son, the ninth Marquess, who succeeded in 1999.

The courtesy title for the Lord Lansdowne's eldest son and heir apparent alternates between Earl of Kerry and Earl of Shelburne.

The family seat is Bowood House, near Calne, Wiltshire. The family's former London residence was Lansdowne House in Berkeley Square. A major late-1990s/early-2000s housing development in the northwest of Calne was named Lansdowne Park after the local seat.

Earls of Shelburne (1753)
John Petty-Fitzmaurice, 1st Earl of Shelburne (1706–1761)
William Petty-Fitzmaurice, 2nd Earl of Shelburne (1737–1805), created Marquess of Lansdowne in 1784

Marquesses of Lansdowne (1784)
William Petty-Fitzmaurice, 1st Marquess of Lansdowne (1737–1805)
John Henry Petty-Fitzmaurice, 2nd Marquess of Lansdowne (1765–1809)
Henry Petty-Fitzmaurice, 3rd Marquess of Lansdowne (1780–1863)
Henry Petty-Fitzmaurice, 4th Marquess of Lansdowne (1816–1866)
Henry Charles Keith Petty-FitzMaurice, 5th Marquess of Lansdowne (1845–1927)
Henry William Edmund Petty-FitzMaurice, 6th Marquess of Lansdowne (1872–1936)
Charles Hope Petty-FitzMaurice, 7th Marquess of Lansdowne (1917–1944)
George John Charles Mercer Nairne Petty-FitzMaurice, 8th Marquess of Lansdowne (1912–1999)
Charles Maurice Petty-FitzMaurice, 9th Marquess of Lansdowne (b. 1941)

The heir apparent is the present holder's son, Simon Henry George Petty-Fitzmaurice, Earl of Kerry (b. 1970)
The heir apparent's heir apparent is his son George Henry Charles Petty-Fitzmaurice, Viscount Calne and Calstone (b. 2020)

Line of succession

  George Petty-Fitzmaurice, 8th Marquess of Lansdowne (1912–1999)
  Charles Petty-Fitzmaurice, 9th Marquess of Lansdowne (born 1941)
 (1)  Simon Petty-Fitzmaurice, Earl of Kerry (born 1970)
  (2)  George Petty-Fitzmaurice, Viscount Calne and Calstone (born 2020)
  (3) Lord William Petty-Fitzmaurice (born 1973)
  (4) Lord Robert Mercer Nairne (born 1947)
 (5) Samuel George Mercer Nairne (born 1976)
 (6) George Yvan Mercer Nairne (born 2009)
  (7) Harold Charles Mercer Nairne (born 2011)
  (8) Joseph Douglas Mercer Nairne (born 1980)
  (9) Fergus Grey Mercer Nairne (born 2009)
  (10) Angus John Mercer Nairne (born 2013)

Middleton connection
It was reported in 2012 that the direct descendants of Thomas FitzMaurice, brother of the first Marquess, included brothers Lieut. Osmund Fitzmaurice Bullock and Sir Christopher Bullock and that Sir Christopher's wife, Lady Bullock (née Barbara May Lupton), was a second cousin of Olive Middleton (née Lupton), the great grandmother of the Princess of Wales.

See also
Edmond Petty-FitzMaurice, 1st Baron FitzMaurice
Lord Nairne
Baron Lansdowne
Earl of Kerry, now a courtesy style (along with Earl of Shelburne) for the heir apparent
Earl of Orkney, held by the Fitzmaurice family for some generations

References

Sources 

Kidd, Charles, Williamson, David (editors). Debrett's Peerage and Baronetage (1990 edition). New York: St Martin's Press, 1990,

External links

Marquessates in the Peerage of Great Britain
Noble titles created in 1784
 
Peerages created for the Prime Minister of the United Kingdom